Jessie 'Jay' Purves was an international table tennis player from the United States.

Table tennis career
She won two World Championship medals including a gold medal in the Women's Team event at the 1937 World Table Tennis Championships.

Hall of Fame
She was inducted into the USA Hall of Fame in 1979 months after her death.

See also
 List of table tennis players
 List of World Table Tennis Championships medalists

References

American female table tennis players
Year of birth missing
1979 deaths